The American Journal of Agricultural Economics is a peer-reviewed academic journal of agricultural, natural resource, and environmental economics, as well as rural and community development. Published five times per year, it is one of two journals published by the Agricultural & Applied Economics Association, along with Applied Economic Perspectives and Policy. It was established in 1919, at which point it was called the Journal of Farm Economics.

Editors 
The current editors are Amy Ando (University of Illinois, Urbana-Champaign), Marc Bellemare (University of Minnesota), Jill McCluskey (Washington State University), and Jesse Tack (Kansas State University).

References

External links 
 
 Journal page on Association website

Economics journals
Agricultural economics
Oxford University Press academic journals
Publications established in 1919
English-language journals
Academic journals published by university presses
5 times per year journals